The Rural Home Missionary Association (RHMA) is a rural church network in the United States. It was founded in 1942.

RHMA seeks to plant new churches and strengthen existing churches through conferences and training. Glenn Daman suggests that it has been "instrumental in expanding rural church ministry."

In her 2019 book God Land, Lyz Lenz relates how she attended an RHMA training conference and was advised to carry a gun while preaching. Lenz argues that the curriculum was "male-centric" and notes that RHMA-supported missionaries must be "men in heterosexual relationships".

References

External links
 

Christian organizations established in 1942
Evangelical organizations established in the 20th century
Christian organizations based in the United States